.

Since 2017, it has been the site of a privately owned holistic retreat center.

History

 The name "Valmora" is a manufactured word, meaning "in the valley of the Mora river." It was founded in 1916 as a community serving a tuberculosis sanitarium, long since closed. Because of this, however, in 1995 Valmora was added to the registry of National Historic Places.

References

Unincorporated communities in Mora County, New Mexico
Unincorporated communities in New Mexico